Vrba is a small village in the Municipality of Lukovica in the eastern part of the Upper Carniola region of Slovenia.

References

External links

Vrba on Geopedia

Populated places in the Municipality of Lukovica